Bruce Davidson may refer to:
 Bruce Davidson (equestrian) (born 1949), American equestrian
 Bruce Davidson (footballer) (born 1950), Australian footballer for Footscray
 Bruce Davidson (photographer) (born 1933), American photographer
 Bruce Davidson (politician) (born 1951), Australian politician

See also
 Bruce Davison (born 1946), American actor